Cheongdam-dong Scandal is a 2014 South Korean morning soap opera starring Choi Jung-yoon, Lee Joong-moon, Kang Seong-min, Seo Eun-chae and Lim Seong-eon. It aired on SBSTV from July 13, 2014 to January 28, 2015 on Mondays to Fridays at 8:30 a.m. for 158 episodes.

Despite airing in a morning time slot, Cheongdam-dong Scandal hit a peak rating of 22.1% during its 155th episode on December 24, 2014, and had average ratings of 14.8%.

Plot
Cheongdam-dong is the seat of wealth and prestige in Korean high society, but an ugly, deeply rooted scandal shakes it to its core when a woman who is determined to get pregnant learns that she is being deceived by the family (her mother-in-law, sister-in-law, and her husband) she was married into, and discovering that the building designer (whose mother supposedly had died) that she just befriended was a person she saved when she was a young girl. She is unaware that she is being sought after by her birth mother (after a woman kidnapped her when she was a baby), who is now married to a businessman and now has a daughter who happens to be jealous of her because she sees her as a rival for the love of her life.

Cast
Choi Jung-yoon as Eun Hyun-soo
Lee Joong-moon as Jang Seo-joon
Jeon Jin-seo as young Jang Seo-joon
Kang Seong-min as Bok Soo-ho
Seo Eun-chae as Nam Joo-na
Lim Seong-eon as Lee Jae-ni
Ban Hyo-jung as Jang Hye-im
Lee Hye-eun as So-jung
Kim Seung-hwan as Joon-gyu
Uhm Bo-yong as Cho-won
Kim Hyeseon as Kang Bok-hee
Kim Jung-woon as Bok Kyung-ho / Kim Young-gyu
Yu Ji-in as Choi Se-ran
Im Ha-ryong as Nam Jae-bok
Lee Sang-sook as Woo Soon-jung / Lee Do-hwa
Yang Hae-rim as Park Hye-jung
Kim Sung-kyung as Dr. Yoon
Seo Yi as Yoon-joo
Sa-Hee as Joo Young-in
Lee Jung-gil
Jang Mi-hee
Choi Hyun-soo
Ahn So-mi

Original soundtrack

Part 1

Part 2

Part 3

Part 4

Part 5

Part 6

Part 7

Part 8

Part 9

Part 10

Part 11

Part 12

Awards and nominations

References

External links
Cheongdam-dong Scandal official SBS website 

Seoul Broadcasting System television dramas
2014 South Korean television series debuts
Korean-language television shows
Mystery television series
Pregnancy-themed television shows
2015 South Korean television series endings
South Korean mystery television series
South Korean melodrama television series
Television series by Hwa&Dam Pictures